B.W. Thayer & Co. was a lithographic printing studio owned by Benjamin W. Thayer (1814-1875) in Boston, Massachusetts in the 1840s-1850s. Clients included music publisher William H. Oakes.

References

External links

 WorldCat
 Boston Public Library. Flickr.
 University of Pennsylvania. Keffer Collection of Sheet Music.
 American Antiquarian Society. Information about B.W. Thayer.
 Bostonian Society. Catalog records for works by B.W. Thayer.
 Boston Athenaeum. Catalog records for works by B.W. Thayer.

American lithographers
Economic history of Boston
Cultural history of Boston
19th century in Boston
19th-century lithographers
19th-century American printmakers